Samuel Davis (1774 – April 20, 1831) was a U.S. Representative from Massachusetts.

Biography
Born in Bath in Massachusetts Bay's Province of Maine, Davis engaged in mercantile pursuits and became a shipowner in 1801. He served as member of the Massachusetts House of Representatives in 1803 and 1808-1812. He served as overseer of Bowdoin College from 1813 to 1818 and as president of Lincoln Bank in Bath in 1813.

Davis was elected as a Federalist to the Thirteenth Congress (March 4, 1813 - March 3, 1815). He was again a member of the Massachusetts House of Representatives in 1815 and 1816.

In his private life he was a merchant in African and West Indian trade. 

He died in Bath, Maine, on April 20, 1831, and was interred in Maple Grove Cemetery.

References 

Biodata

1774 births
1831 deaths
People from Bath, Maine
Businesspeople from Maine
Federalist Party members of the United States House of Representatives from Massachusetts